Jacques Rougerie (born 11 July 1945 in Paris) is a French Architect and Oceanographer who specialises in underwater habitats.

Biography 
Born in 1945 to a mathematician mother and a biogeographer father, companion of Theodore Monod, Rougerie lived in Ivory Coast until he turned 11. After moving to Francewhen he was 19, he entered The École Nationale Supérieure des Beaux-arts in 1964, attending the Auguste Perret workshop directed by Andre Remondet and Paul Maymont. Inspired by Jacques-Yves Cousteau and first underwater habitats, he took classes in Institut Océanographique de Paris in 1970, while studying at French Institute of Urbanism and Ecole des Arts et Métiers under the lead of Jean Prouvé. In 1972 he got a master's degree in architecture.

Rougerie bases his research  on bionic architecture, in accordance with principles of sustainable development, aiming at emphasizing the role of the sea in the history of the humanity. Rougerie builds underwater habitats and laboratories, aquatic centers, transparent shell vessels, subaquatic museums and conceives underwater living areas.

In 2008, Rougerie was elected at the Institut de France - Académie des Beaux-Arts and in 2009, he was awarded the Légion d'Honneur. His flagship project SeaOrbiter, is a futuristic seabed exploration vessel. Rougerie is also involved in floating hotels and universities projects.

Main creations

Museums and aquatic centers
1981 : Sea Pavilion (Kobe, Japan),
1989 : Océanopolis I (Brest),
1991 : Nausicaá I (Boulogne-sur-Mer),
2000 : Océanopolis II (Brest),
2001 : Nausicaá II (Boulogne-sur-Mer),
2014 : Caribbean Sea Centre (Guadeloupe),
2014 : Kochi Oceanarium (India),
2015 : Alexandria underwater archaeological museum (Egypt).

Underwater habitats
1973-75 : « Village sous la mer », Virgin Islands (USA), conceived to work and live under the sea, 
1977 : « Galathée », his first underwater habitat, 
1978-98 : « Aquabulles », underwater shelter, 
1981 : « Hippocampe », subaquatic habitat, 
1989 : « Aqualab », underwater habitat-laboratory, based on the concept of transparent shells vessels,
1981 : « Aquascopes », variable buoyancy trimaran,
1982 - 2000 : « Aquaspace », sail trimaran with a transparent shell.

Other creations
1991 : Institut français d’Informatique (Marne la Vallée),
1991 : Larousse Formula 1 Factory(Signes),
1994 : Environmental research center (Dunkerque),
2009 : Stade aquatique de l'agglomération de Vichy,
2012 : La Tontouta International Airport,
2013 : Piscine Molitor.

Research and projects
 Marine City « City in the Ocean » (United Arab Emirates),
 Embassair private airport terminals (London, New York),
 Malley Star tower on positive energy (Prilly-Lausanne, Switzerland),
 Shell Tower (United Arab Emirates),
 Atlantide Hotelia Complex.
Seaspacelab : underwater laboratory (USA),
Aquaspace III : underwater observation trimaran,
SeaOrbiter : 58 m high, 31 immersed, SeaOrbiter is a project aimed at constant oceans observation. Drifting with the sea currents, this platform should enable divers and underwater robots to explore the marine life of the deep, underwater flaws and sunken ruins.

Bibliography 
Habiter la mer, (EMOM, 1978);
Les Enfants du Capitaine Némo, (Arthaud, 1985);
De  Lieues sous les Mers à SeaOrbiter, (éditions Democratic Book, 2010)

References

External links
Official Site
SeaOrbiter
Jacques-Rougerie Foundation

1945 births
Living people
Architects from Paris
Arts et Métiers ParisTech alumni
20th-century French architects
21st-century French architects
Members of the Académie des beaux-arts
Members of the Académie d'architecture
Underwater habitat designers
Chevaliers of the Légion d'honneur